Fleury-Mérogis is a commune in the Essonne department in northern France, in the southern suburbs of Paris. The commune has the Fleury-Mérogis Prison, France's and Europe's largest prison.

Population
Inhabitants of Fleury-Mérogis are known as Floriacumois.

Education
The commune has three groups of preschools (écoles maternelles) and elementary schools: Robert-Desnos, Paul-Langevin, and Joliot-Curie.

Gallery

See also

Communes of the Essonne department

References

External links

Official website 

Mayors of Essonne Association 

Communes of Essonne